Samuel H. Pottle  (May 8, 1934 – July 4, 1978) was an American composer, conductor, and musical director involved in many theatrical and television productions. Born in New Haven, Connecticut, he is perhaps best remembered for his work on Sesame Street and The Muppet Show, having co-written the iconic theme song by using the music from the song Musik, Musik, Musik which is used originally in the movie Hello Janine! with music composed by Peter Kreuder. However, Pottle was also involved with many theatrical productions in the 1960s and 1970s. His principal collaborators were David Axelrod and Tom Whedon, although he also worked with other lyricists.

Pottle graduated from Yale in 1955. At Yale he was president of the Yale Dramatic Association, and in 1954 he wrote the music for the Dramat's successful original musical, "Stover at Yale."  His father was Frederick Pottle, Sterling Professor of English at Yale.

He died on July 4, 1978 from a heart attack while on holiday in Great Barrington, Massachusetts.  His partner, writer Charles Choset, dedicated the 1982 plays Letters to Ben  and The Messiah to him. His remains were donated to medical science.

Credits

Theatre
All Kinds of Giants (off Broadway) (1961) book and lyrics by Tom Whedon
Money a Musical Play for Cabaret (1963) with book and lyrics by David Axlerod and Tom Whedon
The Mad Show  (1966) Broadway theatre - conductor
Keep Tightly Closed in a Cool Dry Place (La MaMa Experimental Theatre Club, 1968) - composer
Cry for Us All (Broadway, 1970) - musical supervisor
The Meehans (1977) - composer

Television

Sesame Street
Musical director
Composer
"What's the Name of That Song?" (with David Axlerod) - 1974
"City-Country Song" (with Emily Kingsley) - 1974
"Mary Had a Bicycle" (with David Korr) - 1974
"I Just Adore Four" (with Joseph A. Bailey) - 1974
"Numerical Correspondence Song" (with David Korr and David Axlerod) - 1974
"The Subway" (with Grace Hawthorne) - 1974
"Swamp Mushy Muddy" (with Norman Stiles and David Axlerod) - 1974
"Beep" (with Emily Kingsley) - 1974
"Happy / Sad" (with Gene Moss) - 1974
"Women Can Be" (with Carol Hall) - 1974
"Wonder Child" (with David Axlerod) - 1974
"A Very Simple Dance" (with Carol Hall) - 1974
"Counting Is Wonderful" (with Emily Kingsley and David Axlerod) - 1975
"I Want a Monster to Be My Friend" (with Robert Pierce) - 1975
"Frazzle" (with David Axlerod) - 1975
"Fur" (with David Axlerod) - 1975
"Monster Lullaby" (with David Axlerod) - 1975
"Keep Christmas With You (All Through the Year)" (with David Axlerod) - 1975
"Elevator Song" (with Ray Sipherd) - 1976
"It's Funny" (with David Korr) - 1976
"The Transylvania Polka" (with Tony Geiss) - 1976
"Madame Schwartzhead Blending" (with David Axlerod) - 1976
"This Frog" (with David Axlerod) - 1976
"One Way" (with Christopher Cerf) - 1976
"Bus Stop" (with David Axlerod) - 1976
"A Song from Kermit" (with David Axlerod) - 1976
"I Love a March" (with Carol Hall) - 1976
"Ah, For the Joys of the Countryside" (with David Axlerod) - 1976
"Proud of Me" (with Carol Hall) - 1976
"Just Around the Corner" (with David Axlerod and Ray Sipherd) - 1976
"Furry Blue Mommy of Mine" (with David Axlerod) - 1977
"Cookie Disco" (with Christopher Cerf) - 1977
"Feelin' Good/Feelin' Bad" (with David Axlerod) - 1977
"I Got a Song" (with David Axlerod) - 1977
"Sound It Out" (with Sara Compton) - 1977
"Sing After Me" (with Tony Geiss) - 1977
"Count Up To Nine" (with David Axlerod) - 1977
"This is my J" (with David Axlerod) - 1977
"Three Waltzing Chickens" (with David Axlerod) - 1977
"Disco D" (with Tony Geiss) - 1978
"I Hate Christmas" (with David Axlerod) - for Christmas Eve on Sesame Street, 1978

The Muppet Show
Composer
"The Muppet Show Theme" (with Jim Henson) - 1976

Other works
Composer
"Dear Lord and Father of Mankind" (text by John Greenleaf Whittier) for SATB choir and piano, publ. Trigon Music, 1972
"Jabberwocky" (text from Lewis Carroll's poem of the same name) for SATB choir, piano, harpsichord and small instruments, publ. Trigon Music, 1972
"We'll Find America" (with David Axlerod) - 1975

External links

References

American male composers
American male conductors (music)
Yale University alumni
1934 births
1978 deaths
20th-century American conductors (music)
20th-century American composers
20th-century American male musicians
Sesame Street crew